The 2022 Horizon League men's basketball tournament was the final event of the 2021–22 men's basketball season for the Horizon League. It was held March 1–8, 2022, with first-round and quarterfinal games played at the home courts of the higher seeds, and all remaining games contested at Indiana Farmers Coliseum in Indianapolis. The winner, Wright State, received the conference's automatic berth into the NCAA tournament.

Seeds 
All of the teams participated in the tournament with the top-four teams receiving byes to the quarterfinals. Tiebreakers used are 1) Head-to-head results, 2) comparison of records against individual teams in the conference starting with the top-ranked team and working down and 3) NCAA NET rankings on the first available report after the regular season is complete. Cleveland State got the #1 seed over Purdue Fort Wayne due to a better head-to-head record.

Schedule 

*Note:Milwaukee will host UIC in first round, As UIC waived right to host championship events

Bracket 
The Horizon League does not use a fixed bracket tournament system, and pairings are re-seeded after the first and second rounds.

References 

Tournament
Horizon League men's basketball tournament
Basketball competitions in Indianapolis
College sports in Indiana
Horizon League men's basketball tournament
Horizon League men's basketball tournament